Paul Nash (born 16 October 1959) is an Australian former swimmer. He competed in the men's 1500 metre freestyle at the 1976 Summer Olympics.

References

External links
 

1959 births
Living people
Australian male freestyle swimmers
Olympic swimmers of Australia
Swimmers at the 1976 Summer Olympics
People from Ealing
Sportspeople from London
20th-century Australian people